PP-22 Chakwal-II is a Constituency of Provincial Assembly of Punjab.

2008-2013:PP-20 (Chakwal-I)

2013—2018:PP-20 (Chakwal-I)

2018—2023: PP-21 (Chakwal-I))

General elections are scheduled to be held on 25 July 2018.

See also

 Punjab, Pakistan

References

External links
 Election commission Pakistan's official website
 Awazoday.com check result
 Official Website of Government of Punjab

Provincial constituencies of Punjab, Pakistan